Ceranthia abdominalis is a tachinid fly in the genus Ceranthia of the family Tachinidae. The species was first described by Jean-Baptiste Robineau-Desvoidy in 1830.

Distribution
It is found in most of Europe and in eastern Russia.

Hosts
Cyclophora moth species and Thera britannica (spruce carpet moth) are hosts.

References

Diptera of Europe
Diptera of Asia
Tachininae
Insects described in 1830
Taxa named by Jean-Baptiste Robineau-Desvoidy